Yvan Bernier (born 17 June 1960) was a member of the House of Commons of Canada from 1993 to 2000. He is a businessperson by career.

He was elected in the Gaspé electoral district under the Bloc Québécois party in the 1993 federal election. He was re-elected in 1997 under the restructured territory of the Bonaventure—Gaspé—Îles-de-la-Madeleine—Pabok riding. Bernier served in the 35th and 36th Canadian Parliaments before leaving Canadian politics.

References
 

1960 births
Living people
Bloc Québécois MPs
Members of the House of Commons of Canada from Quebec
People from Gaspésie–Îles-de-la-Madeleine